Yes I Am is the fourth studio album by the American singer-songwriter Melissa Etheridge, released by Island Records on September 21, 1993. The title is generally thought to refer to Etheridge's recent coming out as a lesbian, confirming long-standing rumors about her personal life. However, in 2018, Etheridge clarified that in fact the title for the track and album were not statements regarding her sexual identity. Yes I Am is the pivotal album that gave Etheridge national and international recognition. The rock ballad "Come to My Window" was the first single released from the album, which peaked at No. 25 on the Billboard Hot 100, and its video featured the actress Juliette Lewis having a nervous breakdown. This single was quickly followed by "I'm the Only One", which became a major hit in the US and reached No. 8 on the Hot 100, and "If I Wanted To", which reached No. 16.

By 2010, the album had sold over 4,348,000 copies in the United States alone, according to Nielsen SoundScan. In 2018, Etheridge went on tour to celebrate the 25th anniversary of Yes I Ams release and also re-released the album with eight bonus tracks.

 Recording and production 
The songs on Yes I Am were recorded at A&M Studios in Los Angeles, California. The album was produced by Etheridge and Hugh Padgham, who also engineered the album. Padgham had previously worked mainly with British artists and bands including Genesis, David Bowie and Sting. He also produced Etheridge's next album, Your Little Secret.

The main musicians backing Etheridge were Kevin McCormick (who had co-produced her previous albums), Mauricio Fritz Lewak, Waddy Wachtel and Scott Thurston. Pino Palladino replaced McCormick on several tracks and David Sutton replaced him on one song. Ian McLagen and James Fearnley also made appearances.

 Track listing 
All songs written by Melissa Etheridge.
"I'm the Only One" – 4:54
"If I Wanted To" – 3:55
"Come to My Window" – 3:55
"Silent Legacy" – 5:22
"I Will Never Be the Same" – 4:41
"All American Girl" – 4:05
"Yes I Am" – 4:24
"Resist" – 2:57
"Ruins" – 4:53
"Talking to My Angel" – 4:48

 Personnel 
The following people contributed to Yes I Am:
Melissa Etheridge – vocals, electric guitar, acoustic guitar, producer
Waddy Wachtel – electric guitar
Scott Thurston – keyboards
Kevin McCormick – bass guitar
Mauricio Fritz Lewak – drums, percussion
Pino Palladino – bass guitar
David Sutton – bass guitar on "All American Girl"
James Fearnley – accordion on "Talking to My Angel"
Ian McLagan – Hammond organ on "I Will Never Be the Same"
Technical
Hugh Padgham – producer, mixing engineer
Greg Goldman – assistant engineer
John Aguto – assistant engineer
Mike Baumgartner – assistant engineer
Bob Ludwig – mastering

 Charts 

 Weekly charts 

 Year-end charts 

 Decade-end charts 

 Awards Grammy Awards'

|-
|rowspan="3"| 1995
|rowspan="2"| "Come to My Window"
|Best Female Rock Vocal Performance
| 
|-
|rowspan="2"|Best Rock Song
| 
|-
| I'm the Only One
| 
|-
|}

Certifications

References 

Melissa Etheridge albums
1993 albums
Albums produced by Hugh Padgham
Island Records albums